Adam Ingi Benediktsson (born 28 October 2002) is an Icelandic footballer who plays for IFK Göteborg as a goalkeeper.

References

External links 

2002 births
Living people
Icelandic footballers
Iceland youth international footballers
Allsvenskan players
Ettan Fotboll players
IFK Göteborg players
FC Trollhättan players
Icelandic expatriate footballers
Expatriate footballers in Sweden
Association football goalkeepers